Barbados participated in the 2015 Parapan American Games.

Competitors
The following table lists Barbados' delegation per sport and gender.

Swimming

Men

See also
Barbados at the 2015 Pan American Games

References

Nations at the 2015 Parapan American Games
2015
Parapan American Games